Walter Raymond Olds (August 17, 1949 – January 11, 2009) was an ice hockey player who played three seasons in the World Hockey Association for the New York Raiders and Calgary Cowboys between 1973 and 1976. He was also part of the Chicago Cougars' organization, but never played for them.

Early life 
Olds was born in Warroad, Minnesota, and raised in Baudette, Minnesota. As an amateur, he played for the Minnesota Golden Gophers men's ice hockey team, where he was an all-American defenseman. He was a member of United States Olympic team at the 1972 Winter Olympics, where he earned a silver medal.

Career 
Olds was drafted 57th overall by the Detroit Red Wings of the NHL in the 1969 NHL Amateur Draft but never played in the National Hockey League due to his strong opposition to fighting, choosing instead to sign with the Raiders of the rival WHA.

Olds left North American professional hockey following the 1975–76 season and moved to Europe, where he continued playing for eight years in Austria (1976–77), Germany (1977–80), Switzerland (1980–81), Sweden (1981–82), and Norway (1982–83). He was recalled by the US national team for the 1977, 1979 and 1981 Ice Hockey World Championships tournaments.

Personal life 
Olds died of colon cancer on January 11, 2009.

Awards and honors

References

External links
 
 Wally Olds @ hockeydraftcentral.com
 Wally Olds' interview about growing up in Baudette, MN

1949 births
2009 deaths
People from Warroad, Minnesota
American men's ice hockey defensemen
Calgary Cowboys players
Detroit Red Wings draft picks
Frölunda HC players
Hampton Gulls (SHL) players
Ice hockey players from Minnesota
Ice hockey players at the 1972 Winter Olympics
Long Island Cougars players
Minnesota Golden Gophers men's ice hockey players
New York Raiders players
Oklahoma City Blazers (1965–1977) players
Olympic silver medalists for the United States in ice hockey
People from Baudette, Minnesota
Springfield Indians players
Medalists at the 1972 Winter Olympics
AHCA Division I men's ice hockey All-Americans